is a passenger railway station located in the city of Chōfu, Tokyo, Japan, operated by the private railway operator Keio Corporation.

Lines 
Sengawa Station is served by the Keio Line, and is located 11.5 kilometers from the starting point of the line at Shinjuku Station.

Station layout 
This station consists of two opposed  semi-underground side platforms serving two tracks,  with the station building located above.

Platforms

History
The station opened on April 15, 1913, initially named . It was renamed in 1917.

Passenger statistics
In fiscal 2019, the station was used by an average of 82,714 passengers daily. 

The passenger figures (boarding passengers only) for previous years are as shown below.

Surrounding area
 Sengawa Theater
Shirayuri University

See also
 List of railway stations in Japan

References

External links

- Keio Railway Station Information 

Keio Line
Stations of Keio Corporation
Railway stations in Tokyo
Railway stations in Japan opened in 1913
Chōfu, Tokyo